Patriot is an American comedy-drama television series created by Steven Conrad. It premiered on November 5, 2015, on Amazon Prime Video, with the remaining first-season episodes released on February 23, 2017. It stars Michael Dorman, Kurtwood Smith, Michael Chernus, Kathleen Munroe, Aliette Opheim, Chris Conrad, Terry O'Quinn and Debra Winger. In April 2017, Amazon announced that it had renewed the series for a second season, which premiered on November 9, 2018. In July 2019, Amazon announced that it had no plans for a third season.

Premise
To prevent Iran from going nuclear, intelligence officer John Tavner must forgo all safety nets and assume a perilous non-official cover ("NOC")  of a mid-level employee at a Milwaukee industrial piping firm.

Cast and characters

Main
 Michael Dorman as John Tavner, a troubled intelligence officer and folk singer posing as an industrial engineer
 Kurtwood Smith as Leslie Claret, John's boss at McMillan, his engineering firm
 Michael Chernus as Edward Tavner, John's easygoing brother and a Texas congressman
 Kathleen Munroe as Alice Tavner, John's wife
 Aliette Opheim as Detective Agathe Albans, a Luxembourg homicide detective who crosses paths with John
 Chris Conrad as Dennis McClaren, John's coworker and self-described best friend
 Terry O'Quinn as Tom Tavner, John and Edward's father and a Director of Intelligence  
 Debra Winger as Bernice Tavner (season 2), John's mother and the United States Secretary of Transportation.

Recurring

 Julian Richings as Peter Icabod, John's off-putting coworker
 Gil Bellows as Lawrence Lacroix, a McMillan executive
 Marcus Toji as Stephen Tchoo, John's brain-damaged coworker
 Tony Fitzpatrick as Jack Birdbath, a disgraced ex-cop and McMillan security guard
 Sylvie Sadarnac as Detective Lucie Prum-Waltzing, Agathe's colleague
 Charlotte Arnold as Ally O'Dhonaill, Stephen's nurse
 Sadieh Rifai as Mahtma El-Mashad, the wife of a nuclear physicist sent to pick up money for Walley
 Hana Mae Lee as Numi Haruno, a puppeteer, escort, and petty thief who causes trouble throughout Luxembourg
 Zoe Schwartz as Sophie, Agathe's colleague
 Kane Mahon as Mikham Candahar, an agent working for Walley
 Antoine McKay as Gregory Gordon, a human resources worker at McMillan
 Azhar Usman as Kkyman Candahar, Mikham's easygoing brother
 Sabina Zeynalova as Sandrine Gernsback, Agathe's colleague
 Matthew Lunt as Detective Emile Mills, Agathe's colleague
 Norm Sousa as Edgar Barros, an airport worker who causes problems for John
 Jaclyn Hennell as Lori, a McMillan worker with whom Lacroix is infatuated
 Mark Boone Junior as Rob Saperstein, John's friend and a fellow folk singer
 Jay Abdo as Cantar Walley, a pro-nuclear, anti-Israel candidate for Iran's presidency
 Eye Haïdara as Detective Nan Ntep (season 2), a French homicide detective
 Jolie Olympia Choko as Myna Albans, Agathe's young daughter
 Cindy Bossan as Detective Sandrine Gernsback (season 2), Agathe's colleague

Episodes

Season 1 (2015–17)

Season 2 (2018)

Production

Development
On May 14, 2015, it was reported that Amazon had given the production, written by Steven Conrad and then titled The Patriot, a pilot order. On September 23, 2015, the series' pilot order was confirmed and further information regarding the series was released. It was announced that the series had been retitled Patriot and that Conrad was confirmed to direct the pilot episode and executive produce alongside Gil Bellows, Glenn Ficarra, Charlie Gogolak, and John Requa.

On December 18, 2015, it was announced that the production had been given a series order. On January 27, 2017, it was reported that the rest of season one would premiere in its entirety on February 24, 2017.

On April 18, 2017, it was announced that the series had been renewed for a second season. On October 10, 2018, it was announced that the second season would premiere on November 9, 2018.

Casting
In August 2015, it was announced that Kurtwood Smith, Michael Dorman, Kathleen Munroe, and Terry O'Quinn had been cast in the pilot's lead roles. On March 22, 2016, it was reported that Chris Conrad, previously cast in a guest appearance in the pilot episode, had been upped to a series regular capacity for the remainder of season one.

On January 4, 2018, it was announced that Debra Winger had been cast in a series regular role for season two.

Filming
Principal photography for the first season commenced in the spring of 2016 in Chicago, Illinois.

Reception

On Rotten Tomatoes it received an overall score of 91%, and an overall score of 71 on Metacritic.

Season 1
The first season met with positive critical response. On the review aggregation website Rotten Tomatoes, the first season holds an 82% approval rating with an average rating of 6.5 out of 10 based on 28 reviews. The website's critical consensus reads, "Patriot is dark, quirky, and often funny -- and although its risks don't always pay off, the series is still savvy and inspired enough to watch." Metacritic, which uses a weighted average, assigned the season a score of 68 out of 100 based on 16 critics, indicating "generally favorable reviews".

Many of the first season's Luxembourg based exterior scenes were filmed in Prague. The Luxemburger Worts culture correspondent noted the apparent lack of effort and accuracy in portraying the landmarks and geography that characterize Luxembourg City, with Prague being a poor substitute for their depiction. He recorded that the frequent onscreen appearance of unmistakable famous Prague landmarks, such as the Charles Bridge, throughout Luxembourg shots hinder the suspension of disbelief for viewers familiar with either location. Additionally, he identified certain factual inaccuracies about Luxembourg in the script, including a claim that Brazilian nationals make up a substantial minority of Luxembourg residents, when in fact it is Portuguese nationals. Despite what he labeled as these "absurd inaccuracies" he recommended the series for fans of dark comedy.

Season 2
The second season also received positive reviews from critics. On Rotten Tomatoes, it holds a 100% approval rating with an average rating of 6.7 out of 10 based on 11 reviews. The website's critical consensus reads, "Patriots second season is dark as pitch and ticks along to a slow-burning surreality, but viewers who are willing to invest in the series' moody pleasures will find themselves infiltrated by its scabrous humor and crackerjack dialogue." On Metacritic, it has a score of 80 out of 100 based on 4 critics, indicating "generally favorable reviews".

Awards and nominations

References

External links

2015 American television series debuts
2018 American television series endings
2010s American comedy-drama television series
Amazon Prime Video original programming
English-language television shows
Nonlinear narrative television series
Television shows set in Luxembourg
Television shows set in Milwaukee
Television shows set in Paris
Television shows filmed in Illinois
Television shows filmed in the Czech Republic